The 2014 Estonian Figure Skating Championships took place between 7 and 8 December 2013 in Tallinn. Skaters competed in the disciplines of men's singles, ladies' singles on the senior levels.

Senior results

Men

Ladies

Junior results

Men

Ladies

Ice dancing

References

External links
 2014 Estonian Championships results
 2014 Estonian Junior Championships results

Estonian Figure Skating Championships
Figure Skating Championships
Estonian Figure Skating Championships, 2014
2013 in figure skating